Liza Mary Harvey (née Browne; born 25 October 1966) is an Australian politician who was the Liberal Party member of the Legislative Assembly of Western Australia from 2008 to 2021, representing the seat of Scarborough. She was a minister in the government of Colin Barnett, and in 2016 was appointed deputy premier, becoming the first woman to hold the position. She became leader of the opposition after being elected unopposed to replace Mike Nahan as state Liberal leader on 13 June 2019. On 22 November 2020, she resigned as Liberal leader and was replaced by Zak Kirkup. She lost her seat at the 2021 election.

Early life
Harvey was born in Manjimup, Western Australia, to Jill Annette (née Randell) and Eugene Michael Browne. Her mother was a descendant of George Randell, an early settler of Western Australia. Harvey attended primary schools in Perth and Port Hedland, and secondary school at Mercedes College, Perth. She went on to study science at the University of Western Australia. Harvey worked for Qantas between 1989 and 2000, holding positions in customer service and at the Qantas Club. She also helped to run a recreational fishing business with her husband, and was involved with various local business associations.

Politics
Harvey entered parliament at the 2008 state election. She won the newly created Scarborough (a notionally Liberal seat) with 55.2 percent of the two-party-preferred vote. In December 2010, Harvey was made parliamentary secretary to Simon O'Brien, in his capacity as the Minister for Small Business. She was elevated to the ministry in June 2012, replacing Rob Johnson as Minister for Police and Minister for Road Safety. After the 2013 state election, Harvey was additionally made Minister for Small Business and Minister for Women's Interests. In a ministerial reshuffle in August 2013, she lost the small business portfolio to Joe Francis, but was made Minister for Tourism instead. In another reshuffle in December 2014, she took over from Kim Hames as Minister for Training and Workforce Development, with Hames taking on the tourism portfolio.

In December 2015, Kim Hames announced his intention to resign as deputy leader of the Liberal Party (and to retire from parliament at the 2017 state election). Harvey was elected as his replacement unopposed in February 2016, and was sworn in as deputy premier a few days later, becoming the first woman to hold either position. In January 2017, Harvey confirmed that she would stand for the Liberal leadership once Colin Barnett retired. However, on 21 March former treasurer Mike Nahan was elected unopposed as the new leader of the party with Harvey continuing as his deputy.

Leader of the Opposition 
Nahan resigned as leader on 13 June 2019, and Harvey was elected his successor unopposed. She was the first woman to be the leader of the WA Liberal Party and the second woman to serve as WA opposition leader after Carmen Lawrence.

Harvey called for WA to open its borders during the COVID-19 pandemic. She was widely criticised for that position, including by some in her own party. Due to poor opinion polling, Harvey resigned as Liberal leader on 22 November 2020 and was replaced by Zak Kirkup at the following leadership election.

At the 2021 election, Harvey lost her seat of Scarborough to Labor's Stuart Aubrey.

Personal life
Harvey married her husband, Hal Lewis Harvey, in 1996. He had one daughter from a previous relationship, and they had a son and a daughter together. Her husband was diagnosed with pancreatic cancer in 2011, and died from the disease in 2014, aged 55.

See also
 Women in the Western Australian Legislative Assembly

References

1966 births
Living people
Deputy Premiers of Western Australia
Liberal Party of Australia members of the Parliament of Western Australia
Members of the Western Australian Legislative Assembly
People from Manjimup, Western Australia
21st-century Australian politicians
21st-century Australian women politicians
Women members of the Western Australian Legislative Assembly
Leaders of the Opposition in Western Australia